The  was a seasonal overnight express train service in Japan operated by East Japan Railway Company (JR East), which runs between Ueno Station in Tokyo and  via the Shinetsu Main Line and Hokuriku Main Line. The journey takes approximately seven hours. The train was operated as a regular daily service by West Japan Railway Company (JR West) until 13 March 2010, with operations transferred to JR East from this date. While JR East has not formally announced its discontinuation, no services have operated since February 2012.

Rolling stock
Trains were formed of 6-car 485 series electric multiple units (EMU) owned by JR East and based at Niigata depot. All seats are reserved.

Formation
The 6-car 485 series sets based at Niigata are formed as follows, with car 1 at the Ueno and Kanazawa end (trains reverse en route at Nagaoka).

Past rolling stock
From 1982 onward, services were formed of eight 14 series coaches, consisting of three B-type 3-level berth sleeping cars and five seating coaches. These services were hauled by a Tabata-based JNR Class EF62 electric locomotive between Ueno and Naoetsu, and by a Nagaoka-based JNR Class EF81 electric locomotive between Naoetsu and Kanazawa.

From March 1993, the locomotive-hauled trains were replaced by 9-car JR West 489 series EMUs based at Kanazawa depot, formed as shown below.

History
The Noto name was first used from 22 September 1959 for express services operating between Tokyo and Kanazawa via , introduced to supplement the existing Hokuriku services connecting Tokyo and the Hokuriku region. The "down" working departed from Tokyo Station at 20:30, arriving in Kanazawa at 08:44, and the "up" working departed from Kanazawa Station at 18:00, arriving in Tokyo at 06:25. Initially, the trains were formed of seven cars (three sleeping cars and four seating cars), but from 1962, trains were increased to 13-car formations.

Following the opening of the Tokaido Shinkansen between Tokyo and Osaka in October 1964, ridership of the Noto decreased, and from October 1965, Noto services ran in conjunction with Yamato services. The services were discontinued from the start of the 1 October 1968 timetable revision.

The name was resurrected from the start of the timetable revision on 10 March 1975 for use on overnight services between Ueno and Kanazawa via the Joetsu Line, replacing one return Hokuriku working.

From 15 November 1982, following the opening of the Joetsu Shinkansen, Noto services were re-routed via the Shinetsu Main Line, and the ageing rolling stock was replaced with newer 14 series cars.

From October 1997, following the opening of the Nagano Shinkansen and severing of the Shinetsu Main Line at Karuizawa, the Noto services were re-routed via the Joetsu Line.

Regular daily Noto services were discontinued on 13 March 2010. The Noto, however, continued to operate as a "seasonal" service during holiday periods.

See also
 List of named passenger trains of Japan

References

East Japan Railway Company
West Japan Railway Company
Named passenger trains of Japan
Night trains of Japan
Railway services introduced in 1959
Railway services discontinued in 2012
2012 disestablishments in Japan